The Kulin nation is an alliance of five Aboriginal nations in south central Victoria, Australia. Their collective territory extends around Port Phillip and Western Port, up into the Great Dividing Range and the Loddon and Goulburn River valleys.

Before British colonisation, the tribes spoke five related languages. These languages are spoken by two groups: the Eastern Kulin group of Woiwurrung, Boonwurrung, Taungurung and Ngurai-illam-wurrung; and the western language group of just Wathaurung.

The central Victoria area has been inhabited for an estimated 40,000 years before European settlement.
At the time of British settlement in the 1830s, the collective populations of the Woiwurrung, Boonwurrung and Wathaurong tribes of the Kulin nation was estimated to be under 20,000. The Kulin lived by fishing, cultivating murnong (also called yam daisy; Microseris) as well as hunting and gathering, and made a sustainable living from the rich food sources of Port Phillip and the surrounding grasslands.

Due to the upheaval and disturbances from British settlement from the 1830s on, there is limited physical evidence of the Kulin peoples' collective past. However, there is a small number of registered sites of cultural and spiritual significance in the Melbourne area.

Nations
 Woiwurrung (Woy-wur-rung) – the Wurundjeri people
 Boonwurrung – the Boonwurrung people
 Wathaurong (Wath-er-rung) – the Wathaurong people
 Taungurung (Tung-ger-rung) – the Taungurung people
 Dja Dja Wurrung (Jar-Jar-Wur-rung) – the Dja Dja Wurrung or Jaara people

At certain times of the year, these nations would meet at Yarra Falls to settle disputes, to trade, and to hold corroborees.

Diplomacy

When foreign people passed through or are invited onto tribal lands, the ceremony of Tanderrum – freedom of the bush – is performed. This is intended to allow for safe passage and temporary access and use of land and resources by foreign people. It is a diplomatic rite involving the landholder's hospitality and a ritual exchange of gifts.

Notes

Citations

Bibliography

External links
 Kulin nation
 The Loddon Aboriginals

Aboriginal peoples of Victoria (Australia)
Kulin nation